Eulepidotis umbrilinea is a moth of the family Erebidae first described by Paul Dognin in 1914. It is found in the Neotropics, including Peru.

References

Moths described in 1914
umbrilinea